Helicobacter cholecystus is a bacterium first isolated from gallbladders of golden hamster with cholangiofibrosis and centrilobular pancreatitis. It is filamentous, Gram-negative, and motile, with a single polar-sheathed flagellum. It is also microaerophilic.

References

Further reading
Dworkin, Martin, and Stanley Falkow, eds. The Prokaryotes: Vol. 7: Proteobacteria: Delta and Epsilon Subclasses. Deeply Rooting Bacteria. Vol. 7. Springer, 2006.
Barrett, Alan DT, and Lawrence R. Stanberry. Vaccines for Biodefense and Emerging and Neglected Diseases. Access Online via Elsevier, 2009.
Chan, Voon Loong. "Bacterial genomes and infectious diseases." Pediatric research 54.1 (2003): 1–7.
Hau, Jann, and Steven J. Schapiro, eds. Handbook of laboratory animal science: Essential principles and practices. Vol. 1. CRC Press, 2002.
Gyles, Carlton L., et al., eds. Pathogenesis of bacterial infections in animals. Wiley. com, 2008.

External links

LPSN
Type strain of Helicobacter cholecystus at BacDive -  the Bacterial Diversity Metadatabase

Campylobacterota
Bacteria described in 1997